Oreamnus Lake is a small alpine lake in Boise County, Idaho, United States, located in the Sawtooth Mountains in the Sawtooth National Recreation Area.  There are no trails leading to the lake or the Goat Creek drainage.

Oreamnus Lake is in the Sawtooth Wilderness, and a wilderness permit can be obtained at a registration box at trailheads or wilderness boundaries.  Three Lake, Limber Lake, and Packrat Lake are upstream of Oreamnus Lake.

References

See also
 List of lakes of the Sawtooth Mountains (Idaho)
 Sawtooth National Forest
 Sawtooth National Recreation Area
 Sawtooth Range (Idaho)

Lakes of Idaho
Lakes of Boise County, Idaho
Glacial lakes of the United States
Glacial lakes of the Sawtooth Wilderness